The 1987 Australian Film Institute Awards were awards held by the Australian Film Institute to celebrate the best of Australian films and television of 1987. The awards ceremony was held at the Palais Theatre in Melbourne on 9 October 1987.

Feature film

Television

References

External links
 Official AACTA website

AACTA Awards ceremonies
1987 in Australian cinema